RPC Group plc is based in the United Kingdom, and is one of Europe's largest supplier of plastic packaging. Its headquarters are in Rushden in Northamptonshire. It was listed on the London Stock Exchange until it was acquired by Berry Global Group Inc.

History
The company's origins lie in a plastic packaging production unit at Oakham established by a Danish group, Superfos, in 1973. The plant was acquired by Reed International in 1983 and was the subject of a management buyout as Reedpack Containers in 1988, but was then bought by Svenska Cellulosa Aktiebolaget in 1990. The business was then the subject of a management buyout from Svenska Cellulosa Aktiebolaget in 1991. It was first listed on the London Stock Exchange in 1993. It went on to buy Continental Plastics Europe, with 12 sites across Europe, in 1997 and Wiko, an injection moulding business based in Germany, in July 2000. In December 2010 it bought Superfos Industries, its former parent, for about €240 million (£203 million).

Acquisitions
In December 2013 the company acquired Maynard & Harris Plastics, a manufacturer of rigid plastic packaging, for £103.5 million and in May 2014 it bought Ace Corporation Holdings, a Chinese injection moulder, for up to $430 million. It then bought Promens, with 50 plants internationally, in a €386 million (£306 million) deal in December 2014.
 
For 2016, the company earned £2.75 billion, a two-thirds jump in revenue from the year before after a series of acquisitions. Among those acquisitions were the bottle-top maker GCS in France and British Polythene Industries. In March 2016 the company bought French bottle-top maker Global Closure Systems for €650 million (£468.7 million) to strengthen its position in Europe's plastic packaging market and in August 2016 the company bought British Polythene Industries for £261 million. It went on to buy Letica, an American business, for $640 million in February 2017. As of June 2017, Pim Vervaat served as chief executive. Since December 2015, RPC had completed 11 acquisitions.

Take-over
The company announced in March 2019 that it had agreed to be taken over by Berry Global Group Inc.

Operations
The company makes a wide variety of plastic food-packaging products including Heinz Tomato Ketchup, Nivea, L'Oréal, Saxa, Jacob's, McVitie's and Hubba Bubba.

References

External links
 Official website

Companies established in 1988
Packaging companies of the United Kingdom
Rushden
Companies listed on the London Stock Exchange
1988 establishments in the United Kingdom
Companies based in Northamptonshire